John Spark Wilson CBE (9 May 1922 – 15 September 1993), known as Jock Wilson, was a British police officer in the London Metropolitan Police.

Wilson was brought up in Dundee. He joined the Metropolitan Police as a Constable in 1946 and joined Special Branch, in which he was to spend over twenty years, in 1948. Promoted Detective Chief Superintendent in 1968, he was in charge of security for the Investiture of the Prince of Wales at Caernarfon Castle in 1969, which was threatened by Welsh nationalists. In 1969 he was promoted to Commander and took command of Special Branch. He was appointed Officer of the Order of the British Empire (OBE) in the 1969 Investiture Honours.

In 1972 he was promoted to Deputy Assistant Commissioner (Crime) and on 17 May 1975 he was appointed Assistant Commissioner "C" (Crime). In 1977 he was transferred as Assistant Commissioner "B" (Traffic), holding the post until his retirement in 1982. He then served as Director of the Security and Investigation Service of T. Miller & Co until 1987. He was appointed Commander of the Order of the British Empire (CBE) in 1979.

Footnotes

References
Biography, Who Was Who

1922 births
1993 deaths
People from Dundee
Assistant Commissioners of Police of the Metropolis
Commanders of the Order of the British Empire